KTWO may refer to:

 KTWO-TV, a television station (channel 2) licensed to Casper, Wyoming, United States
 KTWO (AM), a radio station (1030 AM) licensed to Casper, Wyoming, United States